National Highway 566 (NH 566) is a  National Highway in India.

References

National highways in India
Transport in Vasco da Gama, Goa
National Highways in Goa